Bunga bunga is a phrase of uncertain origin and various meanings that dates from 1910 and a name for an area of Australia dating from 1852. By 2010 the phrase had gained popularity in Italy and the international press to refer to then-Italian Prime Minister Silvio Berlusconi's sex parties with prostitutes, which caused a major political scandal in Italy.

Early use 
An 1852 issue of Hogg's Instructor states that "bunga bunga" is the name given by locals to a location near Moreton Bay on the eastern coast of Australia, although this appears to be a mistaken reference to the Bunya-Bunya pine.

In 1910 Horace de Vere Cole, Virginia Woolf, her brother Adrian Stephen and a small group of friends pretended to be the Prince of Abyssinia and his entourage. They obtained permission to visit one of the world's most powerful warships, HMS Dreadnought, in Weymouth, Dorset, in what became known as the Dreadnought hoax. It was reported that each time the Commander showed them a marvel of the ship, they murmured the phrase bunga, bunga! which then became a popular catchphrase of the time. Adrian Stephen had this to say about the phrase:
{{blockquote| ... one of the newspapers published an interview. I think it was supposed to be with one of the assistants at Clarksons, who professed to know a great deal more than he did, and in particular stated that we used the expression "Bunga-Bunga". Anyhow the words "Bunga-Bunga" became public catchwords for a time, and were introduced as tag in music-hall songs and so forth. Apparently the Admiral was unable to go ashore without having them shouted after him in the streets, and I suppose the other officers were treated in the same way.<ref>Adrian Stephen, The Dreadnought Hoax, page 51, 1983 reissue.</ref>}}

 Resurgence in Italy 

A century later, the term bunga bunga became popular again as part of a joke on the internet. This joke was then narrated by Italian Prime Minister Silvio Berlusconi at his dinner parties (in a version which featured, as prisoners, former ministers from the centre-left opposition party led by Romano Prodi).

This expression was then frequently quoted by the Italian and international press in the run-up to the 2011 investigation surrounding Silvio Berlusconi's child exploitation, where it acquired a quite different meaning as "an orgy involving prostitutes and a powerful leader". The term was allegedly taught to Silvio Berlusconi by Muammar al-Gaddafi, who was also the unwitting originator of the phrase Zenga Zenga.

In Italy in 2010, the term had become "an instant, supposedly hilarious, household expression". Contemporary explanations disagreed on its meaning or perhaps illustrated its reference range. It was said to be "a sort of underwater orgy where nude young women allegedly encircled the nude host and/or his friends in his swimming pool", "an African-style ritual" performed for male spectators by "20 naked young women", or the erotic entertainment of a rich host involving pole dancing and competitive striptease by skimpy-costumed "women in nurses' outfits and police uniforms", the prize being prostitution for the host.  Sabina Began claimed that the phrase was a nickname based on her surname and that she had organized the parties.Bunga bunga culture sparked a social movement called "Se Non Ora Quando" in 2011, which included street protests.

Writing in 2011, the lexicographer Jonathon Green did not expect the term to make much headway or to last in English.

In popular culture
In the 1950 Bugs Bunny cartoon "Bushy Hare", the quote "Unga Bunga Bunga" was used during a yelling fit between Bugs and "Nature Boy".

In 2006, Flavor Flav released the album Hollywood containing the track "Unga Bunga Bunga";

In 2011, the faux-French, American band Nous Non Plus released a song entitled "Bunga Bunga". The cover of the single featured a picture of Silvio Berlusconi.  The song lyrics list famous cities around the world (in French) while the video is a black and white show-reel of semi-nude dancing women.

In 2012, the term was used in the British motoring show Top Gear'' in Season 18, Episode 1. It was used to describe The Stig's Italian cousin, who emerged from a motor-home dressed in a suit, followed by three glamorous girls, to set a lap time in a Ferrari 458 Italia at the Autodromo Enzo e Dino Ferrari (Imola Circuit).

In 2013, the American band Cherry Poppin' Daddies used the term several times in the lyrics for their song "The Babooch", a satire of "one-percenter" lifestyles. The song's music video features clips of Berlusconi alongside other billionaire figures.

In 2014, comedians Maynard and Tim Ferguson started a podcast named Bunga Bunga.

In 2020, Wondery released a podcast about Berlusconi's rise and fall entitled "Bunga Bunga". The host was comedienne Whitney Cummings.

In the 2021 film No Time to Die, James Bond (played by Daniel Craig) uses the phrase "SPECTRE's Bonga Bunga" while attending a party in Cuba filled with SPECTRE agents.

In the 2022 debut single "You Will Never Work in Television Again" from The Smile, the lyrics refer explicitly to "bunga bunga".

See also
 wiktionary:bunga
 Bongo Bongo Land
 Bongo-Bongo (linguistics)

Notes

References

Erotic dance
Sexuality and society
Sex industry
Politics of Italy
1910s neologisms
2010 in Italy
Political scandals in Italy
Political sex scandals
Silvio Berlusconi
Dreadnought hoax